Fritz Kübert (16 February 1906 – September 1998) was a German footballer. He played club football with Eintracht Frankfurt. 

Fritz Kübert rose through the ranks of the Eintracht Frankfurt academy and played in the first team from 1920. He played as right midfielder. After winning the South German championship in 1930 he lost his starter spot to Rudi Gramlich. 

After World War II, in December 1946 he was elected as committee member at Eintracht. He held this position until 1950 and was Eintracht youth director from 1955 to 1966.

He was an honorary member of Eintracht Frankfurt.

Fritz Kübert had a son also named Fritz Kübert who played one Bundesliga match for Eintracht Frankfurt.

Honours 

 Southern German championship:
 Champion: 1929–30
 Runner-up: 1927–28
 Bezirksliga Main-Hessen:
 Winners: 1927–28, 1928–29, 1929–30

Sources

References

External links
 Fritz Kübert at eintracht-archiv.de
 
 

1906 births
1998 deaths
German footballers
Eintracht Frankfurt players
Association football midfielders
Footballers from Hesse